The 1986–87 Oklahoma Sooners men's basketball team represented the University of Oklahoma in competitive college basketball during the 1986–87 NCAA Division I men's basketball season. The Oklahoma Sooners men's basketball team played its home games in the Lloyd Noble Center and was a member of the National Collegiate Athletic Association's (NCAA) former Big Eight Conference at that time.

After receiving a preseason top 10 ranking, the team posted a 24–10 overall record and a 9–5 conference record. Battle tested, the Sooners received a bid to the 1987 NCAA Tournament, and advanced to the Sweet Sixteen where they fell to Iowa in overtime.

Roster

Schedule

|-
!colspan=9 style=| Non-Conference Regular season

|-
!colspan=9 style=| Big 8 Regular season

|-
!colspan=9 style=| Big 8 Tournament

|-
!colspan=9 style=| NCAA Tournament

Rankings

References

Oklahoma Sooners men's basketball seasons
Oklahoma
Oklahoma